Gardenia mannii, the nānū, Oahu gardenia or Mann's gardenia, is a species of flowering tree in the coffee family, Rubiaceae, that is endemic to the island of Oahu in Hawaii. It is threatened by habitat loss.

There are 18 populations remaining with a total of no more than 110 individuals.

References

mannii
Trees of Hawaii
Endemic flora of Hawaii
Critically endangered plants
Taxonomy articles created by Polbot